Polresta Station is a station of the Palembang LRT Line 1. The station is located between  station and  station. Nearby the station is main police station of Palembang Large City Resort Police (Kepolisian Resor Kota Besar Palembang, abbreviated as Polrestabes Palembang and, formerly, Polresta Palembang), hence its name.

The station was opened on 27 September 2018, after the 2018 Asian Games had concluded.

Station layout

References

Palembang
Railway stations in South Sumatra
Railway stations opened in 2018